Vižmarje is a formerly independent settlement in the northern part of the capital Ljubljana in central Slovenia. It is part of the traditional region of Upper Carniola and is now included with the rest of the municipality in the Central Slovenia Statistical Region. It is located in the northwestern part of the city and belongs to the Šentvid District.

Geography
Vižmarje lies northwest of Šentvid, along both sides of the road towards Brod and Tacen. The northern part of Vižmarje from where the road descends is also called Velike Vižmarje, and the southern part is called Male Vižmarje. Historically, Vižmarje extended to the north all the way to the Sava River; however, as the settlement became more populated, the northern part between the power line and the river was renamed Brod. To the south, Vižmarje extends to Celovška cesta, and to the southeast to Šentvid, which starts approximately where A2 motorway was built. In Vižmarje, there are an elementary school and a railway station. Bus lines 8, 8B, 15, and 25 run through Vižmarje. There is also the bus terminus of city bus line 1, which once was in Vižmarje but was later moved to the other side of Celovška cesta to Gunclje; nevertheless, the name of the terminus was not renamed accordingly.

Name
Vižmarje was attested in written sources in 1283 as Geiselmannsdorf bei Laibach (and as Geyselmansdorf in 1331 and Geismanstorf in 1385, among other variations, as well as Vsmariach and Vsmarich in 1554, and Vismarie in 1763–87). The Slovene name originates from the fused prepositional phrase *v (J)ižmarje 'in Jižmarje', based on the personal name *Jižmar, which was borrowed (and palatalized) from the Middle High German name Gîs(al)mâr. In the more recent past, the German name Wischmarje was used.

A pseudoetymology claims that the name Vižmarje is derived from the exclamation Viš, Marija! 'See, Mary!'

History 

On 17 May 1869, the seventh and best-attended national open-air mass rally, known as a tabor, took place in Vižmarje with 30,000 participants. A factory for cotton fabric was established in 1928, the Skip metals company in 1949, a sports equipment factory in 1954, and the Iskra ceramics and automation plant in 1957. Vižmarje was annexed by the village of Šentvid in 1961, ending its existence as an independent settlement. Šentvid itself was annexed by the city of Ljubljana in 1974.

Notable people
Notable people that were born or lived in Vižmarje include:
Fran Erjavec (1893–1960), editor
Andrej Jemec (born 1934), painter
Manica Koman (1880–1961), writer
Bogomir Pregelj (1906–1970), journalist and librarian
Andrej Snoj (1886–1962), theology professor and Biblical scholar
Ivan Štrukelj (1869–1948), writer

References

External links 
 
Vižmarje on Geopedia

Šentvid District